Lighthouse Battery was an artillery battery in the British Overseas Territory of Gibraltar.

Description
Lighthouse Battery had four  Anti-Aircraft guns during World War II. It was the penultimate battery at the southern end of Gibraltar which is known as Europa Point.

References

Batteries in Gibraltar